Joshua Hayes Carll (born January 9, 1976), known professionally as Hayes Carll, is a singer-songwriter. A native of The Woodlands, Texas, his style of roots-oriented songwriting has been noted for its plainspoken poetry and sarcastic humor.

Career
After releasing his debut album, Flowers & Liquor, in 2002, Carll was voted Best New Act by the Houston Press. Since then he's been compared to other Texas songwriters, including Townes Van Zandt, who he said "ruined me and saved me at the same time." He released his second album, Little Rock, in 2004. Produced by R.S. Field, Little Rock was the first self-released album to reach No. 1 on the Americana Chart. Carll signed with Lost Highway records in 2006 and released his next album, Trouble in Mind, in 2008. It was ranked No. 60 of the year by The Village Voice. "She Left Me For Jesus," which appeared on Trouble in Mind, was the Americana Music Association Song of the Year 2008. Four songs by Carll appeared in the 2010 film Country Strong, three of which also appeared on the film's second soundtrack album, Country Strong: More Music from the Motion Picture.

KMAG YOYO & Other American Stories  was released in 2011. KMAG YOYO is military slang for "Kiss my ass, guys, you're on your own." It received a nomination for Best Album by the Americana Music Association in 2011, and Spin voted it No. 3 in the category of "Best Country/Americana". American Songwriter voted the song "Another Like You" the No. 1 song of 2011, and the album No. 6. Rolling Stone ranked "KMAG YOYO" at No. 46 of best singles of 2011, and the album No. 47 on their list of "50 Country Albums Every Rock Fan Should Own." After KMAGs success, Carll left Lost Highway Records. In 2015 he went into the studio with producer Joe Henry to record Lovers and Leavers and then released the album in April 2016 on his own Highway 87 Records to great critical acclaim.

Carll was nominated for a Grammy Award in 2016, Best Country Song, for "Chances Are". In 2019, he released his sixth album, What It Is, on Dualtone Records. He re-recorded many of his songs, including duets with Ray Wylie Hubbard and his wife, Allison Moorer, for 2020's Alone Together Sessions. His latest album, You Get It All, was released on October 29, 2021 on Dualtone Records.

Discography

Albums

Music videos

Awards and nominations
Grammy Nomination for Best Country Song, 2016, for "Chances Are" (recorded by Lee Ann Womack)

Austin Music Awards
 Musician of the Year (2017)
 Album of the Year (2017)
 Song of the Year (2017)
 Songwriter of the Year (2017)
 Best Male Vocals (2017)
 Album Art (2017)
 Best Folk Performer (2017)

Americana Music Awards

 Artist of the Year Nomination (2012)
 Song of the Year Nomination for KMAG-YOYO (2011)
 Artist of the Year Nomination (2011)
 Song of the Year Nomination for Drunken Poets Dream (2010)
 Emerging Artist of the Year Winner (2010)

SESAC Music Awards

 "Times Like These" (2019)
 "None'Ya" (2019)

References

External links

 Official website

1976 births
Living people
American country singer-songwriters
American male singer-songwriters
Singer-songwriters from Texas
Musicians from Houston
Musicians from Austin, Texas
Lost Highway Records artists
Hendrix College alumni
21st-century American singers
Country musicians from Texas
Country musicians from Arkansas
21st-century American male singers
Singer-songwriters from Arkansas